Cuddihy is a surname. Notable people with the surname include:

Barry Cuddihy (born 1996), Scottish footballer
Caitriona Cuddihy (born 1986), Irish athlete
Joanne Cuddihy (born 1984), Irish sprint athlete
John Murray Cuddihy (1922-2011), American sociologist
Tim Cuddihy (born 1987), Australian archer